Tim Killick (born 1958 in Boston, Lincolnshire, UK) is an English television and theatre actor. He was educated at Bootham School in York and the University of Nottingham.

He is the older brother of theatre director Jenny Killick and BBC's Cathy Killick.
He is married to actress Kate Gielgud.

Filmography
 Without a Clue (1988)
 Erik the Viking (1989)

TV credits
 Auf Wiedersehen, Pet
 Hard Cases
 Further Up Pompeii
 Bergerac
 Lovejoy
 Covington Cross
 Ivanhoe
 Dangerfield
 Children of the New Forest

External links

 

Living people
1958 births
English male television actors